Capitán de Av. Emilio Beltrán Airport  is an airport serving the Mamoré River town of Guayaramerín in the Beni Department of Bolivia.

Airlines and destinations

Accidents and incidents
On 9 January 2012, a TAM flight from Riberalta Airport, Bolivia to Guayaramerín Airport operated by Xian MA-60 FAB-96 landed with the undercarriage not deployed due to a fault, resulting in substantial damage to the aircraft. There were no injuries amongst the five crew and sixteen passengers.

See also
Transport in Bolivia
List of airports in Bolivia

References

External links
OpenStreetMap - Guayaramerín
SkyVector Aeronautical Charts - Beltrán
Bing Maps - Guayaramerín
HERE/Nokia Maps - Guayaramerín

Guayaramerín Airport aviation weather 

Airports in Beni Department